The 1999 Nasarawa State gubernatorial election occurred in Nigeria on January 9, 1999. The PDP nominee Abdullahi Adamu won the election, defeating the APP candidate.

Abdullahi Adamu emerged PDP candidate.

Electoral system
The Governor of Nasarawa State is elected using the plurality voting system.

Primary election

PDP primary
The PDP primary election was won by Abdullahi Adamu.

Results
The total number of registered voters in the state was 702,021. Total number of votes cast was 634,095 while number of valid votes was 613,030. Rejected votes were 21,065.

References 

Nasarawa State gubernatorial elections
Nasarawa State gubernatorial election
Nasarawa State gubernatorial election
Nasarawa State gubernatorial election